Veaceslav Sofroni (born 30 April 1984) is a retired Moldovan professional football player and current head coach of Spartanii Selemet.

Career

Coaching career
In the summer 2018, Sofroni was appointed player-coach of Spartanii Selemet. He left the position one year later, in the summer 2019.

On 1 November 2019, Sofroni became the head coach of FC Zimbru Chișinău, however, on interim basis. He left the position one month later, when Sandro Pochesci was hired. In the summer 2020, Sofroni returned to Spartanii Selemet as the clubs head coach.

Club statistics

International career

International goals
Scores and results list Moldova's goal tally first.

References

External links
 

1984 births
Living people
Moldovan footballers
Moldova international footballers
Moldovan expatriate footballers
Association football forwards
FC Politehnica Chișinău players
FC Irtysh Pavlodar players
FC Atyrau players
FK Vėtra players
FC Zimbru Chișinău players
FC Baku players
FC Costuleni players
FC Speranța Crihana Veche players
FC Academia Chișinău players
FC Spicul Chișcăreni players
Azerbaijan Premier League players
Moldovan Super Liga players
A Lyga players
Kazakhstan Premier League players
Moldovan expatriate sportspeople in Azerbaijan
Moldovan expatriate sportspeople in Kazakhstan
Moldovan expatriate sportspeople in Lithuania
Expatriate footballers in Azerbaijan
Expatriate footballers in Kazakhstan
Expatriate footballers in Lithuania
Moldovan football managers
Moldovan Super Liga managers
FC Zimbru Chișinău managers